Caleb Lyon (December 7, 1822 – September 8, 1875) was Governor of Idaho Territory from 1864 to 1865 during the last half of the American Civil War.

Biography
Caleb Lyon was the son of Marietta Henrietta Dupont (1788–1869) and Caleb Lyon (1761–1835).  In 1841, he married Mary Ann Springsteen. They had a son Caleb (b. 1842) and a daughter Henrietta Frederica (b. 1843).

He attended and graduated from the American Literary, Scientific and Military Academy (later Norwich University), Class of 1841.

Career
In 1847, he was appointed US Consul to Shanghai, but never made it to China – instead he moved to California, and was credited as the designer of the California State Seal adopted in 1849, although the actual design was by Robert S. Garnett.

Lyon was an Independent member of the New York State Assembly (Lewis Co.) in 1851. He resigned his seat on April 26, and was elected to the New York State Senate on May 27, serving during the 74th New York State Legislature's special session in June/July 1851.  Lyon was elected as an Independent to the 33rd United States Congress, holding office from March 4, 1853, to March 3, 1855.

Appointed by President Abraham Lincoln in 1864, as Governor of Idaho Territory, Lyon proved to be extremely unpopular. One journalist wrote he was "a conceited, peculiar man, who made many enemies and misappropriated much of the public funds." During Lyon's administration, the territorial capital was moved from Lewiston to Boise, reputedly because Lyon thought it was better to have the capital in a larger city.

Lyon started a diamond-prospecting frenzy when he claimed that a prospector had found a diamond near Ruby City, Idaho.  Although hundreds of men staked claims, no genuine diamonds were found as a result.

In 1866, an audit showed that Lyon had embezzled $46,418 in federal funds which were intended for the Nez Perce people.  He was never convicted on any charges.

Later life and death
After Lyon's governorship ended, he returned to his home in Rossville, Staten Island, New York, where he purchased a home known as "Ross Castle" in 1859. A small collection of Lyon's papers is preserved by the Staten Island Historical Society at Historic Richmond Town in New York, along with various artifacts associated with the Lyon family.

He died on September 8, 1875 and is interred at Greenwood Cemetery, Brooklyn, Kings County, New York, US.

References

External links
 Retrieved on 2009-03-26
Objects from Caleb Lyon family in the Staten Island Historical Society Online Collection Database
Biographical Directory of the United States Congress

1822 births
1875 deaths
Burials at Green-Wood Cemetery
Norwich University alumni
People from Lewis County, New York
People from Rossville, Staten Island
Members of the New York State Assembly
New York (state) state senators
Members of the United States House of Representatives from New York (state)
People of Idaho in the American Civil War
Governors of Idaho Territory
New York (state) Independents
New York (state) Republicans
Independent members of the United States House of Representatives
19th-century American politicians